Sonny's Dream (Birth of the New Cool) is an album by saxophonist Sonny Criss recorded in 1968 and released on the Prestige label.

Reception

AllMusic awarded the album 4 stars with its review by Scott Yanow stating, "The altoist is backed for the set by a nonet arranged by the great Los Angeles legend Horace Tapscott. The arrangements are challenging but complementary to Criss' style, and he is in top form on the six Tapscott originals... highly recommended for both Criss' playing and Tapscott's writing".
The Penguin Guide to Jazz identified it as part of their recommended "core collection".

Track listing 
All compositions by Horace Tapscott
 "Sonny's Dream" – 7:33  
 "Ballad for Samuel" – 4:22  
 "The Black Apostles" – 5:52  
 "The Golden Pearl" – 5:10  
 "Daughter of Cochise" – 7:34  
 "Sandy and Niles" – 5:26  
 "The Golden Pearl" [alternate take] – 5:06 Bonus track on CD reissue  
 "Sonny's Dream" [alternate take] – 4:21 Bonus track on CD reissue

Personnel 
Sonny Criss – alto saxophone, soprano saxophone
Conte Candoli – trumpet
Dick Nash – trombone
Ray Draper – tuba
David Sherr – alto saxophone
Teddy Edwards – tenor saxophone
Pete Christlieb – baritone saxophone
Tommy Flanagan – piano
Al McKibbon – bass
Everett Brown Jr. – drums
Horace Tapscott – arranger, conductor

References 

Sonny Criss albums
1968 albums
Prestige Records albums
Albums produced by Don Schlitten